The Speaker of the Senate of Northern Ireland was the Speaker in the Senate of Northern Ireland.

List of speakers

See also
 Leader of the Senate of Northern Ireland

References
Members of the Northern Ireland Senate, 1921-1972

Senate of Northern Ireland
Northern Ireland, Senate
Lists of Northern Irish parliamentarians
Northern Ireland, Senate
Northern Ireland, Senate
Northern Ireland, Senate